Bahu Hamari Rajni Kant (Our Daughter-In-Law Rajni Kant) is an Indian science fiction sitcom television series, which aired from 15 February 2016 to 13 February 2017 on Life OK.

Plot 
Shantanu Kant, a scientist creates a super humanoid robot with the help of his best friend Devendra Bangdu.The robot is named RAJNI, short for "Randomly Accessible Jobs Network Interface", a robot with 10X the power of hulk, a human's body, a pretty face and a brain faster than 100 computers.

The robot was made for saving humans' life. After a few episodes, Shaan made Rajni his wife as he did not want to take burden of wedding along with his dreams and aspirations of becoming a renowned scientist. The Kant's women do not like Rajni as her daughter-in-law due to Rajni's weird behaviour, and also because Surili (Shaan's mom) wanted a classy Bengali girl as her 'bahu' - so, Surili never accepts Rajni as her daughter-in-law by heart. But, the Kant's men always favour Rajni and like her nature.

Many problems arise in the Kant family-some of them come by themselves and some are unintentionally created by Rajni as she does not understand humans accurately. But, Rajni always saves the Kants from all these troubles-sometimes with the help of Shaan and Dev. Later Rajni misinterpreted Shaan's command and changed his face by plastic surgery which creates some problems but later all confusions are cleared by Shaan. In the middle of all this, other confusions arises which made Shaan to dismantle Rajni. Kants have gone bankrupt post. Shaan been in USA, returns with his fiancée Ria. The Kant fix the marriage  to get their wealth by Ria's rich family.

It is then revealed that Rajni save herself from the factory 5 years ago where she had found an infant on the streets and had decided to adopt him but Rajni was not updated with latest technologies. Rajni's adoptive son named as R.A.M, incidentally help Kant's family which was then invited to Kant Nivaas where Ria finds out about Rajni and broke up the alliance. Shaan then decides to divorce Rajni. Meanwhile, the court gives Shaan and Rajni 6 months' time to their marriage.

In these 6 months, Rajni wins everyone's,including Shaan's trust back, but later she was proven to be a human by Surili. Soon it gets revealed that the girl was Rajjo, the duplicate of Rajni.

Soon Shaan and Rajjo start developing mutual feelings for each other. Amrish learns about Rajni's truth, he accepts her, but this reunion is stopped by a robot from other planet who looks exactly as Shaan, and asks Rajini to come with him. She is about to leave when Shaan, R.A.M and Amrish try to stop her, but being given command to leave with Shaan-like robot, she turns away. The robots fly away, leaving the three (Shaan, Amrish, R.A.M) in tears when Shaan finds a small machine on the ground, presumably belonging to the robot from other planet and he believes to bring back Rajini with the device.

Cast

Main
 Ridhima Pandit as Rajni Kant / Rajjo: Shaan's wife, Surili daughter-in-law (2016-2017)
 Karan Grover / Raqesh Bapat as Shantanu "Shaan" Kant (2016)/(2016–2017): Rajni's husband, Surili's son

Recurring
 Pallavi Pradhan as Surili Amrish Kant: Shaan's mother
 Rajendra Chawla as Amrish Kant: Shaan's father
 Vahbbiz Dorabjee as Maggie Gyaan Kant: Shaan's elder sister-in-law
 Mehul Nisar as Gyaan Amrish Kant: Shaan's elder brother
 Tanvi Thakkar as Sharmila Dhyaan Kant: Shaan's younger sister-in-law
 Pankit Thakker as Dhyaan Amrish Kant: Shaan's younger brother
 Aly Goni as Virat Batra: husband of Poonam, claims to be Rajni's husband
 Neha Kaul as Shogata Amrish Kant / Shogata Devendra Bangdu/ Shogu (Shaan's younger sister & Dev's ex wife)
 Sweety Walia as Bubbles Kant / Bubbles Amartya Chattopadhyay (amrish kant's sister)
 Sumit Kaul as Amartya Chattopadhyay  (surili kant's brother)
 Neel Motwani as Devendra Bangdu / Dev/ D'Bang (Shaan's best friend and brother-in-law, Shogata's ex husband)
 Anokhee Anand as Aishwarya (Kant family's servant)
 Aryan Prajapati as R.A.M Shantanu Kant (Rajni and Shaan's son)
 Shiny Doshi as Samaira Ghosh (Shaan's ex-girlfriend)
 Suhaas Ahuja as Matthew Hudson / Makrand (Shaan's boss)
 Krishna Bharadwaj as Balwanth (Maggie's younger brother)
 Abhilash Kumar as Vikram Oberoi (Ria's brother) 
 Piya Valecha as Ria Oberoi (Shaan's fiancée)
 Palak Dey as Kuhu Gyaan kant (gyaan and maggie's daughter)
 Archana Singh Rajput as Debolina chatoupadhyay
 Daya Shankar Pandey as Dugdugi Baba

Guest
 Emraan Hashmi as Himself 
 Divyanka Tripathi as TV News Reporter
 Anita Hassanandani as Priya
 Hina Khan as Neha
 Karanvir Bohra as Karanvir
 Iqbal Khan as Robot

Broadcast 
The show aired on Life OK and is being aired again on Star Bharat. It airs also on MBC 2 in Mauritius.  It also aired in a sister channel of Star Maa, a subsidiary of Star India, Star Maa Gold, previously. Currently, the show is aired on Star Suvarna titled as Robo Sose. This show received a Bengali remake titled Koler Bau in 2019 and stars Trina Saha and Rohaan Bhartacharya. It was produced by Blues Productions and ended on 14 January 2020.

External links 
 Bahu Hamari Rajni Kant on Hotstar

2016 Indian television series debuts
2017 Indian television series endings
Hindi-language television shows
Television shows set in Mumbai
Indian television sitcoms
Life OK original programming
Robots in television
Indian science fiction television series